Bombay Diocese is a diocese of the Indian Orthodox  Church located at The Orthodox Church Centre, Vashi, Navi Mumbai.

History
The parishes in Mumbai Region were part of the Outside Kerala Diocese until the Bombay Diocese was formed in 1976. The first parish in Mumbai was St. Mary's Orthodox Syrian Cathedral in Dadar, which was consecrated in 1951 by the late Catholicos Baselios Geevarghese II. The present Diocese of Mumbai was formed in 1976, with Thomas Mar Makarios as its first bishop.

The Diocese established the first Gregorian Community in Roha near Mumbai, with the motto "worship, study, and service". Named after the saint Mary, the community aimed to create a space for young people to meet and experience the richness of nature, to induct them to the monastic life and worship patterns, and to instill a sense of commitment and service to the community.

Diocesan Metropolitan

Parishes

1. Ahmednagar St. Marys Orthodox Church

2. Ambernath St. Gregorios Orthodox Church

3. Andheri St. Johns Orthodox Church

4. Aurangabad St. Marys Orthodox Church

5. Airoli St. Gregorios Orthodox Church

6. Baharin St. Marys Orthodox Cathedral

7. Belgaum St. Gregorios Orthodox Church

8. Borivali St. George Orthodox Church

9. Bhosari St. Gregorios Orthodox Church

10. C.B.D St. Marys Orthodox Church

11. Chembur Mar Gregorios Orthodox Church

12. Chinchwad St. George Orthodox Church

13. Colaba St. Peters Orthodox Church

14. Dadar St. Marys Orthodox Cathedral

15. Dandeli St. Marys Orthodox Church

16. Dehu Road St. Gregorios Orthodox Church

17. Devalali St. Marys Orthodox Church

18. Dighi St. Gregorios Orthodox

19. Doha St. Marys Orthodox Church

20. Dhulia St. Gregorios Orthodox Church

21. Dombivli St. Marys Orthodox Church

22. Hubli St. Marys Orthodox Church

23. Kalamboli St. George Orthodox Church

24. Kalina St. Baselios Orthodox Church

25. Kalyan St. Thomas Orthodox Church

26. Kalyan East St. George Orthodox Church

27. Karad St. Marys Orthodox Church

28. Kirkee St. Thomas Orthodox Church

29. Khopoli St. Gregorios Orthodox Church

30. Bhusaval St. Gregorios Orthodox Church

31. Lonawala St. Gregorios Orthodox Church

32. Malad St.Thomas Orthodox Church

33. Mira-Bhayandher St. Gregorios Orthodox Church

34. Mulund St. George Orthodox Church

35. Nashik St. George Orthodox Church

36. Nerul St. Marys Orthodox Church

37. Nallasoppara St. Gregorios Orthodox Church

38. Panavel St. Gregorios Orthodox Church

39. Pimpri-Kalewadi St. Marys Orthodox Church

40. Pen St. Thomas Orthodox Church

41. Powai St. Pauls Orthodox Church

42. Pune St. Mary's Orthodox Syrian Church 

43. Rasayani St. Marys Orthodox Church

44. Roha St. Peters and St.Pauls Orthodox Church

45. Sakinaka St. George Orthodox Church

46. Silvassa St. Gregorios Orthodox Church

47. Surat St. Beselios Orthodox Church

48. Tarapur St. Gregorios Orthodox Church

49. Thane St. Stephens Orthodox Church

50. Ulhas Nagar St.Marys Orthodox Church

51. Valsad St. Gregorios Orthodox Church

52. Vapi St. Marys Orthodox Church

53. Vasai Road St. Thomas Orthodox Church

54. Vashi St. Thomas Orthodox Church

References

External links
 Official website of Malankara Orthodox Syrian Church

Christianity in Mumbai
Christianity in Maharashtra
Malankara Orthodox Syrian Church dioceses
1976 establishments in Maharashtra